Austin Pettis (born February 8, 1989) is a former American football wide receiver. He was drafted in the third round, 78th overall, in the  2011 NFL Draft by the St. Louis Rams.

Early years
Pettis attended Orange Lutheran High School in Orange, California. He was part of the football team and had 72 receptions for 1,079 yards and 13 touchdowns as a senior. He was named First-team All-league and All-county and Third-team All-state  and was also named to the All-Southern Section Team while helping team to state championship. As a sophomore, he was named Second-team All-league as well as being named top sophomore on team.  He lettered in football three times, basketball three times, and track and field twice.

College career
Pettis finished his Boise State career as the school's all-time leader in both receptions (229) and touchdown catches (39). His 2,838 receiving yards rank second on the all-time list. He was a four-year starter in the Broncos' high-powered offense.  Pettis set career highs with 71 receptions and 951 yards and 10 touchdowns as a senior and earned First-team All-Western Athletic Conference honors for the second consecutive year.

As a junior, in 2009, Pettis had 63 receptions for 855 yards and 14 touchdowns and was a First-team All-WAC selection. Pettis was named Second-team All-WAC after his sophomore season (2007), catching 49 passes for 567 yards, averaging 11.6 yards per catch and nine touchdowns. He was also named to the All-WAC academic team. In 2007 as a true freshmen, he finished season second on team with 46 receptions and finished second on team with six touchdown receptions and third with 465 yards receiving.

Professional career

Pre-draft

At the 2011 NFL Combine, Pettis ran the shuttle in 3.88 seconds, fastest among the receivers at the combine.
Pettis also finished sixth in the 60-yard shuttle (11.14 seconds) and 11th in the 3-cone drill (6.68 seconds).

Pettis was drafted 78th overall in the 2011 NFL Draft by the St. Louis Rams. On July 29, 2011, Pettis signed a four-year contract with the Rams that included a $614,000 signing bonus. In a week 7 loss against the Green Bay Packers in 2012, Pettis caught his first NFL touchdown pass, a 3-yard reception. He was waived on October 20, 2014.

Pettis was signed by the San Diego Chargers on January 9, 2015. He was released by the team on September 5, 2015.

Career statistics
Receiving Statistics

Returning Statistics

Personal life
Austin is the son of Gym Owner & Personal Trainer Kenneth Pettis, grandson of former Major League Baseball player Del Rice, nephew of former Major League Baseball player Gary Pettis, and cousin of actor Kyler Pettis and wide receiver Dante Pettis who plays for the Chicago Bears.

References

External links
 
 

1989 births
Living people
Players of American football from Anaheim, California
American football wide receivers
Boise State Broncos football players
St. Louis Rams players
San Diego Chargers players